Upsal station is a SEPTA Regional Rail station in Philadelphia, Pennsylvania. Located at 6460 Greene Street, it serves the Chestnut Hill West Line.

The former station house, which was originally built by the Pennsylvania Railroad, was a café and restaurant in the 2010s. The station is 9.1 track miles from Suburban Station. In 2017 it saw 356 boardings and 305 alightings on an average weekday.

Station layout

References

External links
SEPTA - Upsal Station
Old PRR Upsal Station images
 Greene Street entrance from Google Maps Street View
SEPTA Regional Rail stations
Former Pennsylvania Railroad stations
Railway stations in Philadelphia